Go Down may refer to:

 Go Down Records, an Italian record label
 Go Down, a 2006 album by the Manges
 "Go Down", a 1977 song by AC/DC from Let There Be Rock
 "Go Down", a 2016 song by Daughtry from It's Not Over...The Hits So Far

See also
 Going Down (disambiguation)
 Warehouse, known as a "godown" in some parts of China and India